Aleksey Sysoyev (born 8 March 1985) is a Russian decathlete.

International competitions

Professional decathlons

Personal bests
100 metres – 10.86 (2004)
400 metres – 48.89 (2006)
1500 metres – 4:29.94 (2006)
110 metres hurdles – 14.83 (2006)
High jump – 2.16 (2005)
Pole vault – 4.70 (2006)
Long jump – 6.95 (2005)
Shot put – 16.08 (2006)
Discus throw – 53.49 (2005)
Javelin throw – 59.60 (2005)
Decathlon –  8108 (2006)

References

1985 births
Living people
Russian decathletes
Olympic decathletes
Olympic athletes of Russia
Athletes (track and field) at the 2008 Summer Olympics
World Athletics Championships athletes for Russia
Russian Athletics Championships winners